Norberto Ladrón de Guevara (31 January 1892 – 23 October 1969) was a Chilean footballer. He played in two matches for the Chile national football team in 1917. He was also part of Chile's squad for the 1917 South American Championship.

References

External links
 
 

1892 births
1969 deaths
Chilean footballers
Chile international footballers
Association football midfielders